Orekhovo is a Moscow Metro station in Orekhovo-Borisovo Severnoye District, Southern Administrative Okrug, Moscow. It is on the Zamoskvoretskaya Line, between Tsaritsyno and Domodedovskaya stations. Entances are situated on the edge of Tsaritsyno park, at the intersection of Shipilovsky drive and Bazhenov street.

Orekhovo opened on 30 December 1984 as part of an extension but was closed the very next day because of flooding. It reopened on 9 February 1985.

The station was designed by architects L. Popov, V. Volovich, and G. Mun. Both the walls and pillars are faced with white marble, and there is a cast bronze sculpture by L. Berlin (devoted to the theme "Protection of Nature") above the escalators. The entrances to the station are located between Shipilovsky Prospekt and Bazhenova Street, on the east side of Tsaritsino Park.

Moscow Metro stations
Railway stations in Russia opened in 1984
Zamoskvoretskaya Line
Railway stations located underground in Russia